Nastassja Burnett was the defending champion, but lost to Tatjana Malek in the second round.

María Teresa Torró Flor won the title, defeating Alexandra Cadanțu in the final, 6–2, 6–3.

Seeds

Draw

Finals

Top half

Bottom half

References 
 Main draw

ITS Cup - Singles
ITS Cup